Irma L. Anderson was the elected mayor of the city of Richmond, California serving between 2001 and 2006. She ran for re-election as the incumbent Democrat in the 2006 mayoral race and lost to Green Party challenger councilperson Gayle McLaughlin by 192 votes.

Before serving as mayor she was a member of the city council from 1993 through 2000. She was the first black woman to serve on the Richmond city council and arguably claimed to be the first African American woman elected mayor of a major California city (although Doris A. Davis served as mayor of slightly smaller Compton, California in 1973).

Anderson earned both RN and BSN degrees from Cornell University. She also earned an MPH at the school of public health of University of California, Berkeley and was a high school valedictorian.

In 1954, Anderson came to Richmond, California with her husband, the late Rev. Booker T. Anderson Jr. (who served as Mayor of Richmond from 1973 to 1974). Anderson has two sons named Ahmad and Wilbert. Ahmad ran for Richmond City Council in 2020. Anderson's career changed from nursing to politics working for the Contra Costa County Health Department where she began as a nurse and advanced to Director of Public Health Nursing. As mayor, Anderson worked with the West Contra Costa Unified School District developing after-school programs throughout the city of Richmond.

See also
 Gayle McLaughlin
 Rosemary Corbin
Mayors of Richmond, California
Politics of the United States

References

External links
Richmond City Council
U.S. Conference of Mayors

Cornell University alumni
Mayors of Richmond, California
Richmond City Council members (California)
Women mayors of places in California
African-American mayors in California
African-American nurses
American nurses
American women nurses
Living people
UC Berkeley School of Public Health alumni
Year of birth missing (living people)
20th-century American women politicians
21st-century American women politicians
21st-century American politicians
20th-century American politicians
1930s births
20th-century African-American women
20th-century African-American politicians
21st-century African-American women
21st-century African-American politicians
African-American women mayors